Carl Albert von Lespilliez (also known as Karl Albert von Lespilliez) (1723-1796) was a German draftsman, architect and printmaker. He worked as an architect for the Bavarian court. His work is held in the collection of the Cooper-Hewitt, National Design Museum and the Metropolitan Museum of Art.

References

 

1723 births
1796 deaths
18th-century German architects
Lespilliez, Carl Albert von
German draughtsmen
German printmakers